After is a 2019 American romantic drama film directed by Jenny Gage and written by Gage, Susan McMartin and Tamara Chestna, based on the 2014 novel of the same name by Anna Todd. The film stars Josephine Langford and Hero Fiennes Tiffin and follows an inexperienced teenage girl who begins to romance a mysterious student during her first months of college. The cast includes Selma Blair, Inanna Sarkis, Shane Paul McGhie, Pia Mia, Khadijha Red Thunder, Dylan Arnold, Samuel Larsen, Jennifer Beals and Peter Gallagher in supporting roles.

After premiered at The Grove in Los Angeles on April 8, 2019. Despite largely negative reviews from critics, who criticized its screenplay and narrative glamorized abusive relationships, it was a commercial success, grossing $69.5 million worldwide against its $14 million budget.

The film launched the After film series.

Plot 
Tessa Young begins her freshman year of college by moving into her dorm room with the help of her mother, Carol, and her boyfriend, Noah. During this process she meets her new roommate Steph and Steph's girlfriend Tristan. The day after, Tessa shares a brief encounter with Steph's friend, Hardin Scott. The following day Steph persuades Tessa to attend a party where she meets Steph's other friends: Zed, Molly, and Jace, and meets Hardin for the second time. The group play truth or dare, which reveals Tessa's virginity; she is dared to kiss Hardin but refuses. Later on at the party Hardin attempts to kiss Tessa, but she rejects his advances and leaves.

The following day Tessa meets with Landon, a classmate she met on her first day of classes, who reveals to her that he and Hardin are soon to become stepbrothers, with his mother engaged to Hardin's father. Following a class debate Hardin again approaches Tessa and insists they start over, inviting her to a nearby lake. While they swim, Hardin kisses Tessa, saying that they cannot remain only friends. Later, the two encounter Molly and Zed at a diner, following which Tessa promises to tell her boyfriend about the kiss she shared with Hardin. Hardin tells her not to do so, saying that he does not date, disappointing Tessa. Noah surprises Tessa with a visit, and the two experience an evening together around a bonfire. In a game of 'suck and blow' at the bonfire party, Jace purposely fails in order to kiss Tessa, making Hardin jealous and leading to a physical confrontation. While Noah sleeps in Tessa's bed after the party, she leaves to check in on Hardin, who has destroyed the house in a drunken rage. She comforts him and the two kiss.

The next day Tessa returns to her dorm to check on Noah, who discovers her affair with Hardin and leaves her, heartbroken. Tessa and Hardin finally decide to date, but her mother threatens to cut her off financially if she continues the relationship, believing Hardin to be a bad influence. Hardin finds an apartment for the two to live together and they attend his father's wedding reception. Hardin reveals that his father was a drunk and that his mother was assaulted by some men his father provoked while drunk. Tessa comforts him and the two head back to their apartment to have sex (Tessa loses her virginity).

Later, Tessa grows concerned about the text messages sent to Hardin by Molly; Tessa attempts to confront him, but he dismisses her and leaves. After leaving the apartment searching for him, Tessa finds him at a diner with Molly, Zed, Steph, and Jace. Molly cruelly reveals Hardin's true intentions by showing Tessa a video from the first party they attended, telling that Hardin only pursued Tessa as a challenge, intending to make her fall in love with him before breaking her heart. Hardin attempts to convince Tessa that his intentions changed as he got to know her, but Tessa ends their relationship.

Heartbroken Tessa returns home to reconcile with her mother and Noah, who both forgive her. In the weeks that follow, Tessa cuts ties with Steph and her group of friends, eventually interviewing for an internship at Vance Publishing. Before she leaves college at the end of the semester, Tessa's lecturer hands her an essay written by Hardin, in which he confesses his love for Tessa; after reading it, Tessa returns to the lake to meet Hardin.

Cast

Production

Development
In 2013, author Anna Todd posted the first chapters of a fanfiction titled After on fanfiction- and fiction-publishing website Wattpad. The fanfiction's original storyline was based on the boyband One Direction, and featured the band's members Harry Styles, Liam Payne, Niall Horan, Louis Tomlinson and Zayn Malik, portrayed as students at Washington State University. The story followed Tessa Young, an "innocent good girl" who becomes involved in a relationship with "bad boy" Styles.

Within a month of publishing the first chapters, the story had acquired 544 million reads; Todd later landed a deal with Simon & Schuster to publish novelizations of the series, with the lead male character's name changed to Hardin Scott; the novels were subsequently released in 2014. The books gained media attention and became New York Times bestsellers.

In 2014, Paramount Pictures acquired the rights to adapt After for film; before the expiry of the company's rights to the film production in mid-2017, the project was headed by screenwriter Susan McMartin. Following this, CalMaple Media and Offspring Entertainment acquired the filming rights, with writer Tamara Chestna hired to rework McMartin's script, and director Jenny Gage overseeing the script's final revisions. McMartin, Chestna, and Gage all received final script credit. CalMaple Media's Mark Canton and Courtney Solomon, Offspring Entertainment's Jennifer Gibgot, Wattpad's Aron Levitz, Meadow Williams of Diamond Film Productions and Dennis Pelino were all credited as producers on the film, alongside Todd herself. The film was financed by CalMaple, Voltage Pictures and Diamond Film Productions, with executive production by Swen Temmel, Nicolas Charier, Jonathan Deckter, David Dinerstein, Jason Resnick, Scott Karol, Ian Brereton, Eric Lehrman, Adam Shankman, Brian Pitt and Vassal Benford. Aviron Pictures distributed the film domestically, with Voltage Pictures handling foreign distribution.

Casting
On May 8, 2018, Julia Goldani Telles and Hero Fiennes Tiffin were cast in the main roles of Tessa Young and Hardin Scott respectively. The actors were selected by the production team, including Todd herself, who was present at the castings and contributed to the casting decisions.

In July 2018, Telles announced her exit from the film due to scheduling conflicts. In the same month, Josephine Langford was announced to play Tessa Young. Todd would later state that once she saw Langford, she "knew right away that was Tessa." Pia Mia was cast in the role of Tristan, a previously male character in the books. Executive producer Swen Temmel was cast as Jace, Shane Paul McGhie and Khadijha Red Thunder were added as Landon Gibson and Steph Jones respectively, Samuel Larsen was set as Zed Evans, and Inanna Sarkis played Molly Samuels. Producer Meadow Williams was additionally cast as Professor Soto, another previously male character in the books. On July 27, Peter Gallagher and Jennifer Beals were announced to play Ken Scott and Karen Gibson, Hardin's father and Landon's mother, respectively, with Selma Blair announced for Carol Young, Tessa's mother, and Dylan Arnold announced for Noah Porter on July 30.

Filming
Principal photography was due to begin in June 2018 in Boston, Massachusetts. In early July, producer Jennifer Gibgot stated that shooting would begin on July 16, 2018, in Atlanta, Georgia shortly after Langford had been cast as Tessa. Principal photography was mainly conducted at Emory University, and production was completed on August 24 of the same year.

Release
After premiered at The Grove in Los Angeles on April 8, 2019, and was released in the United States on April 12, 2019, by Aviron Pictures. The film was released in Latin America on April 10, 2019, by Diamond Films, ahead of its North American release.

Box office
After grossed $12.1 million in the United States and Canada and $57.6 million in other territories for a worldwide total of $69.7 million against a production budget of $14 million.

In the United States and Canada, the film was released alongside Hellboy, Little and Missing Link, and was projected to gross $3–12 million from 2,138 theaters in its opening weekend. The film earned $2.9 million on its first day, including $550,000 from Thursday night previews. It went on to debut to $6 million, finishing eighth at the box office. In its second weekend, the film dropped 58% to $2.5 million, finishing 11th.

Critical response
The site's critical consensus reads, "Tepid and tired, Afters fun flourishes are let down by its generic story." The film has a weighted average of 30 out of 100 on Metacritic, based on eight critics, indicating "generally unfavorable reviews." Audiences polled by CinemaScore gave the film an average grade of "B" on an A+ to F scale, while those at PostTrak gave it 2.5 out of 5 stars.

Critics found the screenplay at fault, with Owen Gleiberman of Variety writing that After was an "innocuous teen pulp soap opera that flirts with 'danger' but, in fact, keeps surprising you with how mild and safe and predictable it turns out to be." John Fink of The Film Stage echoed this sentiment, commenting that "the talented cast is burdened by a dead on arrival screenplay that waters down what could have been an intoxicating tale of first love," though he noted the film was "beautifully shot" and "occasionally aesthetically pleasing."

Accolades
After won the 2019 Teen Choice Award in the category Choice Drama Movie and the 2019 E! People's Choice Award in the category The Drama Movie of 2019.

Sequels 

In May 2019, a sequel was announced, with both Langford and Fiennes Tiffin returning to their respective roles. After We Collided released September 2, 2020, with costars Dylan Sprouse, Charlie Weber, Rob Estes, Louise Lombard, Candice King, Karimah Westbrook and Max Ragone.

A second sequel, After We Fell, released September 1, 2021. A third sequel, After Ever Happy, has been completed and was released on September 7, 2022. Another sequel and prequel are in development.

On August 24, 2022, it was announced that a fourth sequel titled After Everything has finished filming. Langford and Fiennes Tiffin are both set to reprise their roles. The fifth and final installment in the After film series, it will be the only film to not be based on a book in the series.

References

External links
 

2019 films
2019 romantic drama films
American romantic drama films
Emory University
Films about abuse
Films based on American novels
Films based on romance novels
Films based on young adult literature
Films scored by Justin Burnett
Films set in universities and colleges
Films shot in Atlanta
Voltage Pictures films
2010s English-language films
2010s American films